SMS Boa was a torpedo boat of the Austro-Hungarian Navy. In 1910 she was renamed Torpedoboot 15.

Development
Boa and her sister ships, Python, Kígyó (Snake) and Cobra, were the result of competitive tests between two torpedo boats built in 1895–96. Natter was built by the firm of F. Schichau at Elbing, while Viper was built by Yarrow on the Thames at Millbank. Admiralty (Marinesektion) officials were better satisfied with the performance of Viper, and four slightly larger examples were ordered from Yarrow.

Design
Armament consisted of two  quick-firing guns and three  torpedo tubes.

Service history
Launched on the Thames on 20 August 1898, Boa was completed on 24 September of that year.
She and her sister ships formed a division of seagoing torpedo boats capable of challenging Italian forces in the event of war.

In 1910 a new nomenclature was introduced for all Austro-Hungarian torpedo boats. Existing names were discarded and replaced with numbers in the series Torpedoboot 1 to Torpedoboot 49. Boa was renamed Torpedoboot 15, abbreviated Tb 15.

During the First World War, Tb 15 was employed as a convoy escort and minesweeper. Allocated to Britain as a war reparation in 1920, she was immediately sold and scrapped in Italy.

References
Notes

Bibliography

External links
 kuk-kriegsmarine.at : Torpedoboote 13–18

Python-class torpedo boats
1898 ships
Ships built on the River Thames
Cobra-class torpedo boats